"Vigilante Man" is a song by Woody Guthrie, recorded and released in 1940 as one of his Dust Bowl Ballads.

The song is about the hired thugs ("vigilantes") who would violently chase away migrants to California trying to escape the Dust Bowl, a man-made ecological catastrophe in the American Great Plains during the 1930s. One verse refers to the murder of Preacher (Jim) Casy, a central figure in John Steinbecks' 1939 novel The Grapes of Wrath.

The tune was taken from "Sad and Lonesome Day", a song made popular by The Carter Family, which itself borrows from "See That My Grave Is Kept Clean" by Blind Lemon Jefferson.

Recordings

The song has been recorded several times, including:
 1940Woody Guthrie, on the album Dust Bowl Ballads
 1972Ry Cooder, on the album Into the Purple Valley
 1973Nazareth, on the album Razamanaz
 1988Bruce Springsteen, on the album Folkways: A Vision Shared
 1990Hindu Love Gods, on the album Hindu Love Gods
 1996feedtime, on the album Billy
 2002Ray LaMontagne, on the album One Lonesome Saddle
 2005Joe Perry, on the album Joe Perry
 2006Ralph McTell, on the album Gates of Eden

References

1940 songs
Woody Guthrie songs
Ry Cooder songs
Nazareth (band) songs
Bruce Springsteen songs
Songs written by Woody Guthrie